GAEE may refer to:

 Gallic acid ethyl ester, a chemical compound added to food as an antioxidant.
 Google Apps Education Edition, a version of Google Apps platform for educators.
 Kami Reh Gaee, a 2013 Pakistani soap opera.